This is a list of albums released under TS Entertainment.

2008-2009

2010

2011

2012

2013

2014

2015

2016

2018

References

TS Entertainment
Pop music discographies
Discographies of South Korean record labels